Arazede is a town in Montemor-o-Velho Municipality in Portugal. The population in 2011 was 5,508, in an area of 53.45 km2.

References

Freguesias of Montemor-o-Velho